Slobodan Lalović (born in 1954 in Belgrade) is a former Serbian Minister of Labour, Employment, and Social Policy,  the position he served from 2004 to 2007.

In 1978 he graduated from the University of Belgrade's Law School. He was a member of the Social Democratic Party.

Previously, Lalović was the secretary of a committee for investigating economic fraud.  In 2002, he resigned, citing the committee's inefficiency.  He also served as a deputy in the Belgrade City Assembly and in the Serbian parliament.  He is married and has four children.

References

1954 births
Living people
Politicians from Belgrade
Social Democratic Party (Serbia 2001–2010) politicians
University of Belgrade Faculty of Law alumni
Government ministers of Serbia